Republic Commando: Hard Contact is the tie-in novel to the video game Republic Commando, written by Karen Traviss.

Plot
The story begins during the Battle of Geonosis with Clone Commando Darman and his team assaulting a Separatist position. However, the entire squad is massacred in the attack, with Darman being the only survivor. After the battle, he is grouped with other clone commandos in incomplete squads and meets Niner, Fi, and Atin. All four commandos must learn how to work together as a team, as they had in their previous squads.

It is not long before the newly formed squad is given another mission. This time, they are to be inserted onto the planet Qiilura, deep in Separatist territory in order to destroy a research facility developing a nanovirus that specifically targets clone troopers. They also must capture the lead scientist, Ovolot Qail Uthan. However, the facility is guarded by Ghez Hokan, a fearsome Mandalorian mercenary who shows little mercy to his enemies or friends, and commands a small army of militia, Trandoshan slavers, and droids.

When the squad attempts to land on the planet, their ship suffers mechanical problems and is forced to crash land, resulting in Darman being separated from the others. Meanwhile, a young Jedi Padawan, Etain Tur-Mukan, is on the run after her master, Jedi Master Kast Fulier, is killed by Hokan. She goes into hiding and is sheltered with the help of a strange woman named Jinart. Meanwhile, Niner, Fi, and Atin run across and defeat several Separatist patrols in an attempt to find Darman and complete their objective. With Jinart's help, Darman and Etain link up but Etain lacks the self-confidence to lead and tells Darman to take charge. They then manage to reunite with the rest of the squad and make their plans to attack the research facility. Jinart reveals herself to be a Gurlanin, shapeshifting native animals of Qiilura, and gives them vital information on how to approach the facility. Etain and the commandos attack the facility and manage to destroy it and take Uthan prisoner, but Hokan does not give up without a fight, nor does his lieutenant, who wounds Atin and, through shrapnel, Uthan. He fights the Republic forces valiantly, but is eventually outsmarted and killed by Etain who decapitates Hokan with her lightsaber. After their victory, Etain gains a little more confidence in herself and her abilities.

As the extraction dropship arrives, Etain desperately wants to leave with the commandos, but Jedi Master Arligan Zey has different ideas. He wants Etain to stay with him on Qiilura to organize an anti-Separatist resistance movement, and that she would be far more valuable to the Republic by staying behind. Etain reluctantly agrees and parts ways with Omega squad, and especially Darman, as they leave.

Characters 
Mandalorian:
 Ghez Hokan, Qiiluran Militia Leader, Mercenary (Male Human)

Republic Commandos:
 RC-1309 Niner
 RC-1136 Darman
 RC-8015 Fi
 RC-3222 Atin
Jedi:
 Arligan Zey, Jedi Master, Intelligence Officer (Male Human)
 Kast Fulier, Jedi Master (Male Human)
 Etain Tur-Mukan, Jedi Padawan (Female Human)
 Bardan Jusik, Jedi Padawan (Male Human)
Others:
 Jinart, Qiiluran Spy (Female Gurlanin)
 Valaqil, Qiiluran Spy (Male Gurlanin)
 Hefrar Birhan, Qiiluran Barq Farmer (Male Human)
 Hurati, Captain Under Hokan (Male Umbaran)
 Guta-Nay, Lieutenant Under Hokan (Male Weequay)
 Lik Ankkit, Trade Federation Employ (Male Nemoidian)
 Pir Cuvin, Lieutenant Under Hokan (Male Umbaran)
 Ovolot Qail Uthan, Separatist Scientist (Female Human)

See also

 Star Wars Republic Commando series
 Star Wars: Republic Commando
 Star Wars Republic Commando: Triple Zero
 Star Wars Republic Commando: True Colors
 Star Wars Republic Commando: Order 66

References

External links
 Amazon.com Listing
 Official CargoBay Listing
 Republic Commando: Hard Contact at Wookieepedia, the Star Wars wiki

Republic Commando
2004 British novels
2004 science fiction novels
English novels
Novels based on Star Wars video games
Del Rey books